Burkel or Bürkel is a Germanic surname that may refer to
Heinrich Bürkel (1802–1869), German genre and landscape painter
Victor van Strydonck de Burkel (1876–1961), Belgian general 
Charge of Burkel, a skirmish between Belgian and German forces on 19 October 1918, during World War I

German-language surnames